Segregara is a genus of African armored trapdoor spiders that was first described by R. W. E. Tucker in 1917.  it contains only three species, all found in South Africa: S. abrahami, S. paucispinulosa, and S. transvaalensis. Originally placed with the Ctenizidae, it was moved to the Idiopidae in 1985.

See also
 List of Idiopidae species

References

Endemic fauna of South Africa
Idiopidae
Mygalomorphae genera
Spiders of South Africa